Sarama is the  music that accompanies the pre-fight ritual of Muay Thai matches (known interchangeably as Wai khru ram muay or Ram muay).

Terminology
"Sarama" specifically refers to the song played during the pre-fight ritual; subsequent music accompanying is referred to as Phleng Muay. The music is performed by up to four musicians, consisting of a Pi (quadruple-reed instrument - similar to Oboe) player, a pair of Klong khaek players, and a cymbal player (referred to as "ching"). 

During the Ram Muay the tempo of the music starts out slow and stately to match the mood of the ritual.  When the fight commences the tempo is increased and matches the intensity of the audience and action.  The music is a defining part of the atmosphere of traditional Muay Thai; other international forms of kickboxing do not feature music in a similar way.

Instrumentation

The ensemble used for playing Sarama is known as a Pi Muay, a combination of "Pi" (in reference to the leading "Pi" reed instrument) and Muay Thai. 

Pii Chawaa 
While name indicates that it is Javanese in origin, the Pi Chawaa closely resembles Indian shehnai reeds and likely originated on the Indian subcontinent before being introduced to Thailand via trade routes through Java. The Pi Chawaa is made of wood and has the similar conical shape and flared bell of a Western oboe, except whereas an oboe uses a double reed, Pi Chawaa uses a quadruple-reed. 
Klong khaek
A pair of lace drums, with each drum assigned a male or female gender. The drums are played in consistent syncopated rhythm (similar to a hocket). These rhythmic lines patterns are known as "Nathap." Javanese in origin (as with the Pii Chawaa), klong khaek translates "Muslim" ("khaek") "Drum" ("klong"). A similar type of drum exists in Cambodian music. 
 Ching 
Also known by its full name "Ching chap," a set of Thai brass cupped cymbals. The Ching player plays their own "ching" pattern (contrapuntally to the Klong khaek "nathap" pattern). This pattern consists of four beats, alternating in accent, with the "Ching" beat unaccented and the "chap" beat heavily accented (creating a pattern known as "ching chap ching chap").

See also

Wai khru ram muay

References

External links
Documentary film about Muay Thai musicians
Blog with research and interviews with Muay Thai musicians
Muay Thai
Kickboxing terminology
Thai styles of music
Martial arts culture
Muay Thai culture
Sports music

References